Pyozia is an extinct genus of basal Middle Permian varanopid synapsids known from Russia. It was first named by Jason S. Anderson and Robert R. Reisz in 2004 and the type species is Pyozia mesenensis. Pyozia mesenensis is known from the holotype  PIN 3717/33, a three-dimensionally preserved partial skeleton including a nearly complete skull. It was collected from the Krasnoschelsk Formation, dating to the Capitanian stage of the Guadalupian epoch, about 265.8-263 million years ago.

The cladogram below is modified after Anderson and Reisz, 2004.

References

Varanopids
Prehistoric synapsid genera
Fossil taxa described in 2004
Guadalupian synapsids
Prehistoric synapsids of Asia
Taxa named by Robert R. Reisz
Guadalupian genus first appearances
Guadalupian genus extinctions